Valentine "Val" Cumberbatch (14 February 1911 – 23 January 1973) was an English professional rugby league footballer who played in the 1930s and 1940s.

Background
Val Cumberbatch's death was registered in Barrow-in-Furness, Lancashire, England.

Playing career

International honours
Val Cumberbatch won a cap for England while at Barrow in 1938 against France.

Challenge Cup Final appearances
Val Cumberbatch played , i.e. number 2, in Barrow's 4-7 defeat by Salford in the 1938 Challenge Cup Final during the 1937–38 season at Wembley, London on Saturday 7 May 1938.

County Cup Final appearances
Val Cumberbatch played , i.e. number 2, in Barrow's 4-8 defeat by Warrington in the 1937 Lancashire County Cup Final during the 1937–38 season at Central Park, Wigan on Saturday 23 October 1937.

Testimonial match
Val Cumberbatch's Testimonial matches at Barrow were shared with Bob Ayres, John Higgin, William Little and Dan McKeating, and took place against Swinton on Saturday 27 April 1946, and against Oldham on Saturday 27 January 1947.

Career records
Val Cumberbatch is seventh in Barrow's all time try scorers list with 134-tries. Three players jointly hold Barrow's "most tries in a game" record with six tries, they are; Val Cumberbatch against Batley on Saturday 21 November 1936, Jim Thornburrow against Maryport on Saturday 19 February 1938, and Steve Rowan against Nottingham City on Sunday 15 November 1992.

Contemporaneous article extract
"The local intermediate League produced Val Cumberbatch, now with Liverpool Stanley, having been transferred during the war. Still an entertaining player to watch. A Lancashire County winger. Signed by Barrow in 1932."

Genealogical information
Cumberbatch was the son of Theodore Theophilus Cumberbatch (1863/4 – 1931 ), a ship's steward, originally from Barbados, and Mary Ellen née Kewin originally from Ramsey, Isle of Man (Marriage third ¼ 1889 in Fylde district ). Val Cumberbatch's marriage to Mary (née Lightfoot) was registered during fourth ¼ 1937 in Barrow-in-Furness district. They had children; John V. Cumberbatch (birth registered during third ¼ 1938 in Barrow-in-Furness district), and Barrie Cumberbatch (birth registered during fourth ¼ 1942 in Barrow-in-Furness district). Val Cumberbatch was the brother of the rugby league footballer James Cumberbatch.

References

External links
Val Cumberbatch at cumberbatch.org
Val Cumberbatch (Barrow's First Wembley Cup Final & Barrow Testimonial Game for "Big Five") at cumberbatch.org

1911 births
1973 deaths
Barrow Raiders players
Black British sportspeople
England national rugby league team players
English people of Barbadian descent
English people of Manx descent
English rugby league players
Lancashire rugby league team players
Liverpool City (rugby league) players
Place of birth missing
Rugby league wingers